Frankton Junior-Senior High School is a public high school located in Frankton, Indiana.

See also
 List of high schools in Indiana

References

External links
 Official Website

Schools in Madison County, Indiana
Public high schools in Indiana
Public middle schools in Indiana